The Sudanese Women Football League is the top flight of women's association football in Sudan. It is the women's equivalent of the Sudan Premier League, but is not professional. The competition is run by the Sudan Football Association.

History
On 1 October 2019, Sudan witnessed the opening of the first women's football tournament in Sudan, organized by the Sudanese Football Association and sponsored by the Minister of Youth and Sports, Engineer Walaa Al-Boushi. The opening match was between Al Tahady and Al Difaa teams. The opening was attended by hundreds of fans and an estimated number of diplomats and media personnel. The first league was won by Al-Difaa.

Champions
The list of champions and runners-up:

Most successful clubs

See also 
 Women's football in Sudan

References

External links 
 Women football - SFA official website

 
Women's association football leagues in Africa
Women
2019 establishments in Sudan
Sports leagues established in 2019